Cốông is a Loloish language of Vietnam. It is spoken by approximately 1,500 speakers in Mường Tè District, Lai Châu Province, Vietnam. It is related to but quite distinct from Phunoi.

Distribution
According to Jerold Edmondson (2002), Cốông is spoken in 5 villages of Mường Tè District, Lai Châu Province, Vietnam.
Bo Lếch, Can Hồ commune
Nậm Khao, Nậm Khao commune
Nậm Pục, Nậm Khao commune
Tác Ngá, Mường Mồ commune
Nậm Kè, Mường Tong commune

According to Phạm Huy (1998:10), Côống is spoken in the following villages, all of which are in Mường Tè District except for Huổi Sâư.
Bo Lếch, Can Hồ commune
Nậm Luồng, Can Hồ commune (part of Bo Lếch before)
Nậm Khao, Nậm Khao commune
Nậm Pục, Nậm Khao commune
Tác Ngá, Mường Mô commune
Nậm Kè, Mường Toong commune
Huổi Sâư, Chà Cang commune, Mường Lay district

Subdivisions
Phạm Huy (1998:12) lists the following two Côống ethnic subdivisions.
Xí Tù Mạ (Silver Côống)
Xám Khổng Xú Lứ (Golden Côống)

Phrases
Golden Côống and Silver Côống differ linguistically, as illustrated by the following phrases from Phạm (1998:13) in Vietnamese orthography (quốc ngữ).
Golden Coong
Háng lế ('Who is there?')
Hàng chà ('eat rice')
Ý sộ tắng ('drink water')
Silver Coong
À sáng lê ('Who is there?')
Hắng tà ('eat rice')
Lắng tắng ('drink water')

Golden Côống numbers are (Phạm 1998:13):

References

Edmondson, Jerold A. 2002. "The Central and Southern Loloish Languages of Vietnam". Proceedings of the Twenty-Eighth Annual Meeting of the Berkeley Linguistics Society: Special Session on Tibeto-Burman and Southeast Asian Linguistics (2002), pp. 1–13.
Phạm Huy. 1998. Bước đầu tìm hiểu văn hóa dân tộc Côống. Lai Châu: Sở Văn Hóa Thông Tin Lai Châu.
Various. 2014. Văn hóa dân gian người Cống tỉnh Điện Biên (Quyển 1). Hà Nội: Nhà xuất bản văn hóa thông tin. 
Various. 2014. Văn hóa dân gian người Cống tỉnh Điện Biên (Quyển 3). Hà Nội: Nhà xuất bản văn hóa thông tin. 

Southern Loloish languages